The FBI Seeking Terror Information list is the third major "wanted" list to have been created by the United States Department of Justice's Federal Bureau of Investigation to be used as a primary tool for publicly identifying and tracking down suspected terrorists operating against United States nationals at home and abroad. The first preceding list for this purpose was the FBI Ten Most Wanted Fugitives list. In 2001, after the September 11 attacks, that list was supplanted by the FBI Most Wanted Terrorists list, for the purpose of listing fugitives who are specifically wanted for acts of terrorism.

Since inception in January 2002, the Seeking Information list also serves this purpose, but with the big difference from the two earlier lists being that the suspected terrorists on this third list need not be fugitives indicted by grand juries in the United States district courts. Such lower level guidelines now allow for a much quicker response time by the FBI to deliver the early known information, often very limited, out to the public as quickly as possible. As the name of this list implies, the FBI's intent is to acquire any critical information from the public, as soon as possible, about the suspected terrorists, in order to prevent any future attacks that may be in the current planning stages.

All three of the major wanted lists now appear on the FBI web site along with several other types of wanted lists as well. All such FBI lists are grouped together under the heading "Wanted by the FBI."

Precedents and early versions 
The FBI Seeking Information – War on Terrorism list has roots in the two earlier fugitive tracking FBI lists. During the 1990s decade in particular, the FBI began using the Ten Most Wanted list to profile some major terrorists, including Ramzi Yousef and Osama bin Laden among others, such as the 1988 mass murder bombers of Pan Am Flight 103 over Lockerbie, Scotland.

In addition to these Justice Department fugitive programs, an even earlier method of terrorist tracking was created by the United States Department of State, in the Bureau of Diplomatic Security. This DoS effort is known as the "Rewards for Justice Program", which began in 1984, and originally paid monetary rewards of up to $5 million for information countering terrorism.

After 9/11, in 2001, the FBI Most Wanted Terrorists list was created, as a companion list to the extant FBI Ten Most Wanted Fugitives Program, and to the State Department's Rewards for Justice Program.

Original list of 5 in videos from Atef rubble
After January 14, 2002, five individuals delivering what United States Attorney General John Ashcroft described as "martyrdom messages from suicide terrorists" were found on five discovered videos, recovered from the rubble of the home of Mohammad Atef outside of Kabul, Afghanistan. Abd Al Rahim, one of the individuals in the films, was detained by American forces in Guantanamo Bay for seven years and allegedly tortured, though his "martyrdom message" was in fact known to be a video documenting his torture by Al-Qaeda members who imprisoned him.

NBC News said that the five videos had been recorded after the Sept. 11 terrorist attacks in the United States. Of the five individuals originally listed, one has been detained by U.S. authorities, while another was detained and released, a third was killed in a drone strike, a fourth died as a suicide bomber and a fifth has not been brought into custody. None have been formally tried or convicted of any crimes in the United States.

In response, on January 17, 2002, the FBI released to the public the first Most Wanted Terrorists Seeking Information list (now known as the FBI Seeking Information –  Terrorism list), in order to profile the five wanted terrorists about whom very little was known, but who were suspected of plotting additional terrorist attacks in martyrdom operations. The videos were shown by the FBI without sound, to guard against the possibility that the messages contained signals for other terrorists.

Ashcroft called upon people worldwide to help "identify, locate and incapacitate terrorists who are suspected of planning additional attacks against innocent civilians." "These men could be anywhere in the world," he said. Ashcroft added that an analysis of the audio suggested "the men may be trained and prepared to commit future suicide terrorist acts."

On that day, Ramzi bin al-Shibh was one of the only four known names among the five. Ashcroft said not much was known about any of them except bin al-Shibh. The fifth wanted terrorist was identified a week later as Abderraouf Jdey, alias: Al Rauf Bin Al Habib Bin Yousef Al-Jiddi.

The initial five terrorists on videos from the Atef rubble profiled on the list were:

Montreal plot
A week after the initial Afghanistan martyrdom videos were released, the FBI had identified the fifth name, al-Jiddi, or Jdey, a resident of Montreal, Quebec, Canada. An international manhunt was launched January 25, 2002, for his companion, a Canadian citizen named Faker Boussora, then 37. U.S. officials said the two Tunisian-born Canadians were part of a Canadian group plotting to kill more civilians.

Added to the list on January 25, 2002, was:

Yemen plot
On February 11, 2002, the FBI added an additional 17 terrorists to the list. But several days later, on February 14, 2002, six of the names were removed, and the FBI re-published the list as only eleven names and photos, because it was discovered that confusion over transliteration had failed to reveal initially that the removed six wanted terrorists were already in prison in Yemen. According to the FBI report, as a result of U.S. military operations in Afghanistan and on-going interviews of detainees in the Guantanamo Bay detention camp, information became available on February 11, 2002, regarding threats to U.S. interests, which indicated that a planned attack may have been about to occur in the United States or against U.S. interests in the country of Yemen on or around the next day, February 12, 2002.

The six names identified in the Yemen plot on February 11, 2002, but removed from the list on February 14, 2002, as already in Yemen custody were:

The eleven names who were still being sought on February 14, 2002, in relation to the planned February 12, 2002, Yemen plot were:

Three of those remaining eleven suspects (Tunisi, Jeddawi, and Zumari) did not have photos on the FBI website. Along with the earlier six suspects on the list, they brought the total count outstanding for the list to seventeen at that time.

The attack of February 12, 2002, never occurred, but a series of plots and attacks followed later that year in Yemen, including the suicide bombing of the Limburg, a French oil tanker, for which al-Rabeei and others were later convicted. As of 2006, all the individuals of the February 12, 2002, Yemen plot have since been removed from the FBI's current main wanted page and from the official count for the Seeking Information – War on Terrorism list.

Revisions and additions
By February 2, 2003, the FBI rearranged its entire wanted lists on its web site. The outstanding five martyr video suspects (including Jdey's Montreal associate Boussora) were moved to a separate linked page, titled "Martyrdom Messages/video, Seeking Information Alert" (Although both Jdey and Boussora were later returned to the main FBI list page). Additionally, the remaining eight Yemen plot suspects were archived to a linked page titled, "February 2002, Seeking Information Alert". Around this time the FBI also changed the name of the list, to the FBI "Seeking Information – War on Terrorism", to distinguish it from its other wanted list of "Seeking Information", which the FBI already uses for ordinary fugitives, those who are not terrorists.

Along with the re-arrangement, the FBI also continued to add new fugitive names to the list, including one member of The Portland Seven terror cell.

February 2003 alert

April–June 2003 alerts
By June 2003, several new terrorist suspects were added:

September 5, 2003, alerts
Two new additions to the list were introduced by September 5, 2003. In addition, Jdey was also moved on to the main list page, from the earlier archived 2002 group:

Summer 2004 terror alert
On May 26, 2004, United States Attorney General John Ashcroft and FBI Director Robert Mueller announced that reports indicated that seven al-Qaeda members were planning a terrorist action for the summer or fall of 2004. The alleged terrorists listed on that date were Ahmed Khalfan Ghailani, Fazul Abdullah Mohammed, and Abderraouf Jdey, along with Amer El-Maati, Aafia Siddiqui, Adam Yahiye Gadahn, and Adnan G. el Shukrijumah. The first two had been listed as FBI Most Wanted Terrorists since 2001, indicted for their roles in the 1998 U.S. embassy bombings. Jdey was already on the FBI's "Seeking Information" wanted list since January 17, 2002, and el-Maati since February 2003, and Siddiqui and Shukrijumah also since early 2003. Gadahn was added as well to the Seeking Information list.

Escapees from Yemen prison
23 people, 12 of them al-Qaeda members, escaped from a Yemeni jail on February 3, 2006, according to a BBC report. On February 23, 2006, the U.S. FBI confirmed the escape, as they issued a national Press Release naming some of the escapees as new Most Wanted Terrorists, and also one of the escapees as a new addition to the Seeking Information list, Abdullah Al-Rimi. He is being sought for questioning relating to any knowledge he might have of the 2000 attack on the USS Cole.

With this one addition below, as of February 23, 2006, the total count on the outstanding Seeking Information list stood at eight.

Al-Qaeda in Iraq, and Kenya and Indonesia attacks
The very next day, on February 24, 2006, the FBI added an additional three names to the Seeking Information – War on Terrorism list, most notably, Abu Musab al-Zarqawi, the notorious leader of Al-Qaeda in Iraq. This marked the first time that al-Zarqawi had appeared on any of the three major FBI wanted lists. On June 8, 2006, ABC News reported that Abu Musab al-Zarqawi was confirmed to have been killed in Baghdad in a bombing raid the day before by a United States task force. His death was confirmed by multiple sources in Iraq, including the United States government.

Saleh Nabhan was wanted for questioning for attacks in Kenya in 2002. Noordin Top was a member of the Jemaah Islamiyah group, which was involved in bombings in Indonesia between 2002 and 2004. With these three additions, as of February 24, 2006, the total count on the outstanding Seeking Information list stood at ten.

December 10, 2008 alert

April 23, 2011 alert

November 14, 2012 alert

January 29, 2015 alert

January 25, 2019 alert

February 28, 2019 alert

August 12, 2019 alert

October 21, 2021 alert

References

External links
Rewards for Justice
FBI Most Wanted Seeking Information - Terrorism
Help Identify Individuals Traveling Overseas for Combat

FBI Most Wanted Terrorists, Seeking Information
FBI Most Wanted Terrorists, Seeking Information
Most Wanted Terrorists, Seeking Information
FBI Most Wanted Terrorists, Seeking Information
Counterterrorism in the United States